Eva-Maria Poptcheva (born 17 October 1979) is a Spanish politician who has been serving as a Member of the European Parliament for the Citizens–Party of the Citizenry since 2022.

See also 

 List of members of the European Parliament for Spain, 2019–2024

References 

Living people
1979 births
Citizens (Spanish political party) politicians
Citizens (Spanish political party) MEPs
MEPs for Spain 2019–2024
21st-century women MEPs for Spain
21st-century Spanish politicians
21st-century Spanish women politicians
Spanish people of Bulgarian descent